Hollicar Creek is a stream in the U.S. state of Mississippi. It is a tributary to Shubuta Creek.

Hollicar is a name derived from the Choctaw language purported to mean "a sacred thing". Variant transliterations are "Hellicon Creek", "Hollicker Creek", and "Hullicar Creek".

References

Rivers of Mississippi
Rivers of Clarke County, Mississippi
Rivers of Jasper County, Mississippi
Mississippi placenames of Native American origin